Rear Admiral Pujitha Vithana is a Sri Lankan senior Naval officer and incumbent 7th Director General of the Sri Lanka Coast Guard. Prior to that, he served as Deputy Director General of the Sri Lanka Coast Guard (SLCG). He also served as Director Naval Administration at Navy Headquarters.

Early life 
Vithana studied at S. Thomas' College, Bandarawela. He joined Sri Lanka Navy as an Officer Cadet in 1988 for the 18th Intake in the executive branch of the Sri Lanka Navy.

Career 
He was commissioned as a Sub Lieutenant in 1990. Then he completed his Sub Lieutenant Technical Course at the Naval and Maritime Academy in 1991 and has specialized Torpedo and Anti-Submarine from Underwater Warfare School, PNS Bahadur, Karachi, Pakistan. He was Deputy Area Commander Eastern Naval Area of Sri Lanka. Vithana promoted to the rank of Rear Admiral on 9 July 2022.

References 

Sri Lankan rear admirals
Living people
Year of birth missing (living people)